I Am the Cheese is a young adult novel by the American writer Robert Cormier, published in 1977.

Plot

The novel opens with protagonist Adam Farmer biking from his home in the fictional town of Monument, Massachusetts, (based on Cormier's hometown of Leominster, Massachusetts) to visit his father in the fictional town of Rutterburg, Vermont. The story alternates with transcripts of tapes between a "subject" and Brint. The subject receives psychotherapy and is interrogated by Brint.

As the book continues, it is revealed that Adam is the subject, formerly Paul Delmonte of a small New York town. His father, "David Farmer", was a newspaper reporter who was enrolled in the Witness Protection Program (WPP).  The family moved to Monument and escaped several close calls with their identities, but the parents are killed in the penultimate chapter in a car collision. Adam/Paul survives and is taken to a government mental asylum. The last chapter implies that WPP agents killed the family and reveals that Paul is regularly interrogated on the topic. Each time, Paul is unable to handle his realization of his past and embarks on his delusional bike ride across the ground of the facility. At the end of the last tape, Brint recommends authorization to murder Adam.

Characters 

 Adam Farmer (Paul Delmonte) – teenage protagonist
 David Farmer (Anthony Delmonte) - Adam's father, a former newspaper man. He pretends to work for an insurance company.
 Louise Farmer/Delmonte - Adam's mother
 Amy Hertz - Adam's friend and love interest
 Brint - Adam's questioner and "guide" as his psychotherapist
 Mr. Grey - agent in the Witness Protection Program 
 Arthur - a fat man in the town of Hookset who tells Adam of Junior Varney
 Dr. Dupont - a friendly doctor in a mental hospital; Adam is his patient
 Junior Varney - a troublemaker and thief in Hookset
 Whipper and friends - bullies in Carver
 Old man by the gas station - warns him about trusting strangers
 The elderly couple - the man helps him out of the ditch, while the woman criticizes him
Aunt Martha - the only relative they're allowed to talk to

Title

This quote is the last verse from "The Farmer In The Dell", a song that Adam sings during the book:
The cheese stands alone
The cheese stands alone
Heigh-ho, the merry-o
The cheese stands alone 
He sings many of these songs throughout the novel. The song contains several characters, each taking someone with them when the farmer leaves, yet the cheese has nobody.

Adam believes that he is the cheese. He is the bait in a trap. Adam is alone in the world, his mother dead and his father missing, and he lives in a hospital.

Another point is that his father had taught him the song, possibly as a way to reinforce the new name, "Farmer," they had adopted.

Literary significance and criticism

The 1975 novel I Am the Cheese began Cormier's experimentation with first-person, present-tense narration. When Cormier sent the manuscript to the publisher of his previous novel, The Chocolate War, he was confused and depressed, convinced that he was alienating his new young adult audience because of the complex and ambiguous story. However, I Am the Cheese proved to be a success.

Awards and nominations

I Am the Cheese was named to five annual book lists according to the publisher description of the 20th anniversary edition. It won the 1997 Phoenix Award from the Children's Literature Association as the best English-language children's book that did not win a major award when it was originally published twenty years earlier. It is named for the mythical bird phoenix, which is reborn from its ashes, to suggest the book's rise from obscurity.

Film adaptation

I Am the Cheese was released as a movie in 1983, directed by Robert Jiras and starring Robert MacNaughton, Hope Lange, Don Murray, Lee Richardson, Cynthia Nixon and Robert Wagner. The screenplay was written by David Lange (Hope Lange's brother) and Robert Jiras.

Publication history

 1977, USA, Pantheon Books, Pub date ? ? 1977, hardback (First edition) 
 1977, USA, Laurel-Leaf Library, Pub date ? ? 1977, ? binding 
 1977, UK, Victor Gollancz, Ltd,   
 1977, UK, Fontana Lions   
 1997, Knopf, 20th anniversary edition, "with a new introduction by the author 
 2007, Knopf, 30th anniversary edition (1st Knopf trade paper) "includes Reader's Guide and interview with the author" 

WorldCat libraries report holding Danish (1986), Catalan (1987), Spanish (1998), Chinese, Polish, Serbian and Korean-language editions. It is also available in Hungarian (1990).

References

External links
 I Am the Cheese at SparkNotes (analysis)
 Robert Cormier at Random House Authors
 

1977 American novels
American crime novels
American novels adapted into films
American young adult novels
Fiction with unreliable narrators
Novels by Robert Cormier
Novels set in Massachusetts
Novels set in Vermont
Leominster, Massachusetts
Pantheon Books books
Works about witness protection